Archdiocese of Armagh may refer to:

 Roman Catholic Archdiocese of Armagh, a senior primatial and metropolitan see of Ireland
 Diocese of Armagh (Church of Ireland), one of four dioceses of the Church of Ireland